Cichlidogyrus jeanloujustinei is a species of monopisthocotylean monogenean in the family Dactylogyridae (or Ancyrocephalidae according to certain classifications). It is a parasite of the gills of the fish Eretmodus marksmithi (Perciforme, Cichlidae) in Lake Tanganyika, Burundi.

Etymology

According to Rahmouni, Vanhove & Šimková, the specific epithet jeanloujustinei “honors the French parasitologist Jean-Lou Justine, Professor at the Muséum National d’Histoire Naturelle, Paris, France, who is extensively studying the systematics and biodiversity of monogeneans, digeneans, and nematodes.”

References

Dactylogyridae
Animals described in 2017